, or simply Genocider Mode, is a Japanese manga series based on Spike Chunsoft's 2014 video game, Danganronpa Another Episode: Ultra Despair Girls. It was published by Kadokawa Shoten in the magazine Dengeki Maoh and the webtoon platform Famitsu Comic Clear from January 27, 2015, to October 13, 2017, and has been collected in five tankōbon volumes across two separate runs respectively written and illustrated by Machika Minami and Touya Hajime. Genocider Mode retells the game's events and those of Danganronpa: Trigger Happy Havoc from the perspectives of Toko Fukawa and Genocide Jack/Jill, elaborating upon their relationships with Byakuya Togami, Komaru Naegi, and the Servant.

Characters

 – The main character, a former author and intern of the 14th Division of the Future Foundation and survivor of the first killing game, who sneaks into Towa City alongside the forces of fellow killing game survivor and apparent love interest Byakuya Togami to prove herself and her control over Jill to him. After Byakuya's forces are massacred and he is captured by the Servant, Toko is forced to seek out Komaru Naegi, both to ensure her participation in the "demon-hunting game" of the Warriors of Hope and their army of Monokuma robots, and to personally kill her using Jill and her scissors at an unspecified time in the future.

 – A crazed former serial killer and alter of Toko publicly known as "Genocide Jack", whom Toko draws out with a stun gun to smite her foes.

 – The younger sister to Makoto Naegi, who has been imprisoned inside of a mysterious apartment for over a year. Upon being rescued by Byakuya Togami of the Future Foundation, her rescue is derailed by a sudden attack from hundreds of Monokumas commanded by the Warriors of Hope, whom she fights with Toko using a hacking gun.

 – The leader of the 14th Division of the Future Foundation and survivor of the first killing game whom Toko and Jill express romantic and sexual intentions toward, who is captured by the Servant while attempting to rescue Komaru Naegi and several other family members and loved ones of the first game's participants intended as motives.

 – The mastermind behind the Warriors of Hope, member of Ultimate Despair and captor of Byakuya, who manipulates Toko and Monaca for his own purposes.

 – Toko's and Jill's pet stink bug, who has been imprisoned inside of a mysterious apartment for over a year as a potential killing game motive.

Volumes
The series includes eighteen chapters divided into runs of seven and eleven, which have been collected into five tankōbon volumes, the first of which was published in Japanese in January 2015. Three of those were published in English, with the first released in August 2019.

References

External links

  at Dark Horse Comics

2015 manga
Danganronpa
Shogakukan manga
Shōnen manga